is a Japanese footballer currently playing as a midfielder for Kamatamare Sanuki.

Career statistics

Club
.

Notes

References

External links

1997 births
Living people
People from Kawasaki, Kanagawa
Association football people from Kanagawa Prefecture
Hannan University alumni
Japanese footballers
Association football midfielders
J3 League players
Kawasaki Frontale players
Kamatamare Sanuki players